Plaza del Carmen Mall is a two-story enclosed shopping mall in Caguas, Puerto Rico.

History
Originally starting Its development in 1972, Plaza del Carmen Mall opened to the public during the mid 1970s. During the 1980s, it hosted such stores and establishments as a González Padín department store (which anchored the mall), CO-OP Supermarkets, Farmacias El Amal, Western Auto, KB Toys, among others.

Supermercados Amigo opened their first major location at the mall in 1989, this was in part due to them acquiring CO-OP Supermarkets in 1983 and deciding to shutter the chain in the late 1980s.

During the late 1980s to the late 1990s, despite the opening of the Amigo Supermarkets store, the mall looked desolate. This was in part due to Gonzalez Padin ceasing operations in 1995, which was followed by other stores. However, the mall has been able to rebound economically as a mixed-use center.

The Subway restaurant at Plaza del Carmen closed after it was destroyed by Hurricane Maria in September 2017, and reopened in August 2018.

Supermercados Amigo closed Its doors at the mall on June 30, 2017, its space has since been replaced by a discount store called Outlet China.

The Fallas Discount Stores closed in late October 2020, and no plans have been made to replace the anchor space.

References

Caguas, Puerto Rico
Economy of Puerto Rico
Shopping malls in Puerto Rico
Economic history of Puerto Rico